Charlotte Goetschy-Bolognese is a French politician serving as the member of the National Assembly for the 5th constituency of Haut-Rhin since 2022. She replaces Olivier Becht.

Political career
Charlotte Goetschy-Bolognese was born in 1990, she is married and has two children.

She graduated in accounting from Strasbourg and manages a public works equipment company in Richwiller with her husband and father.

She is municipal councilor of Brunstatt-Didenheim in charge of communication.

She is also president of a local association called “Les demoiselles de Brunstatt”.

Following the appointment of Olivier Becht in the Borne government, she became deputy for the Haut-Rhin's 5th constituency

She joined the Renaissance group.

References

1990 births
Living people
Politicians from Mulhouse
Deputies of the 16th National Assembly of the French Fifth Republic